Hillary Jocelyn Wolf (born February 7, 1977) is an American former child actress and judoka.

Career
Wolf is best known for playing Megan, the sister of Kevin (Macaulay Culkin) in the Home Alone series.
She also starred as the lead character Laura in the film Big Girls Don't Cry... They Get Even, Holly Anderson in Murder Ordained, and as Emily in Waiting for the Light.

Filmography

Personal life
Saba won the world judo championships for juniors in 1994 and represented the United States in judo at the 1996 Summer Olympics and the 2000 Summer Olympics.

In 2002, she married her husband Chris Saba. They currently live in Colorado Springs, Colorado with their two sons who were born in 2007 and 2010.

In 2004, Wolf and her husband Chris started a wrestling club called Rocky Mountain Wrestling Club which is located in Colorado Springs, Colorado.

References

External links 
 
 TWOJ Players Profile: Hillary Wolf
 
 Rocky Mountain Wrestling Club

1977 births
Living people
American child actresses
Actresses from Chicago
American female judoka
Judoka at the 1996 Summer Olympics
Judoka at the 2000 Summer Olympics
Olympic judoka of the United States
Sportspeople from Chicago
20th-century American actresses
American film actresses
21st-century American women